Fate of Istus is a multipart adventure for the Dungeons & Dragons roleplaying game, taking place in the World of Greyhawk campaign setting. The module is designed for characters of any class or level, and was published as an in-game vehicle to explain the transition from the game's first to second edition. This is accomplished by goddess Istus's re-evaluation of the inhabitants of Oerth and making changes to the abilities of each character class.

Plot synopsis
Fate of Istus is a collection containing a series of 10 adventure scenarios, each of them designed for player characters of a different character class, and all of them dealing with a plague created by the goddess Istus affecting a different city in the world of Greyhawk.

A deadly plague has stricken civilization; the players suspect this is a sinister test of some sort and venture out to stop it.

Table of Contents

Notable nonplayer characters 
 Cymbelline: Half-elf 9th Level thief / 10th level bard
 Alaric: Human 7th level fighter
 Morgorath's Beastman Avatar: deity can appear as anything
 Arlina: 12th level cleric
 Narlond the white alchemist and the Prophet of Boccob: 18th level magic user

Publication history
WG8 Fate of Istus was written by Nigel Findley, Dan Salas, Stephen Inniss, and Robert J. Kuntz, with a cover by Daniel Horne and interior illustrations by Karl Waller, and was published by TSR in 1989 as a 128-page book. The book's title appears as The Fate of Istus on both the title page/table of contents and in the Introduction.

Credits
Authors: Nigel Findley, Dan Salas, Stephen Inniss, Robert J. Kuntz
Coordinators: Bruce Heard, Karen S. Broomgarden
Editing: Kim Mohan 
Typography: Betty Elmore
Cartography: Diesel 
Cover Art: Daniel Horne 
Interior Art: Karl Waller

Distributed to the book trade in the United States by Random House, Inc., and in Canada by Random House of Canada, Ltd. Distributed to the toy and hobby trade by regional distributors. Distributed in the United Kingdom by TSR UK Ltd.

Reception

See also
 List of Dungeons & Dragons modules

References and footnotes

External links
 Fate of Istus at the TSR Archive

Greyhawk modules
Role-playing game supplements introduced in 1989